Balali is a village in the Charkhi Dadri district of Haryana State, India.

Notable personalities
  Mahavir Singh Phogat, Dronacharya Awardee, father and mentor of the famous Phogat sisters — his four daughters Geeta, Babita, Ritu, and Sangita and his two nieces Vinesh and Priyanka — hail from this village.

See also
 Gudana

References

Villages in Charkhi Dadri district